The Shelsleys are a group of small villages in the Malvern Hills District in the county of Worcestershire, England. Situated on either wide of the Teme Valley near the village of Clifton-upon-Teme, they encompass the formerly distinct civil parishes of Shelsley Beauchamp, Shelsley Kings and Shelsley Walsh. The three merged in 1972 and now share a single parish council.

History

Shelsley means "clearing on a slope" from Old English scelf "shelf (of land)" and leāh "wood, clearing". The name was recorded as Scillislege in 948.

Charles Nott, the Parson of Shelsley, was a leader of the Clubmen who in 1645 drew up the Woodbury Declaration, which listed the grievances that local people had at the behaviour of Royalist forces in the area.

Following the Poor Law Amendment Act 1834 the Shelsleys Parish ceased to be responsible for maintaining the poor in its parish. This responsibility was transferred to Martley Poor Law Union.

Shelsley Beauchamp 
Shelsley Beauchamp is the largest of the three hamlets of the Shelseys.

Shelsley Kings 
Shelsley Kings was in the upper division of Doddingtree Hundred.

Shelsley Walsh 
See main entry Shelsley Walsh

Notes

References

Local government in Worcestershire
Malvern Hills District